Minopa is a genus of sea snails, marine gastropod mollusks in the family Trochidae, the top snails.

Distribution
The species in this marine genus are endemic to Australia and occur off New South Wales, South Australia, Tasmania, Victoria and  Western Australia.

Species
 Minopa legrandi Petterd, W.F., 1879: synonym of Fossarina legrandi Petterd, 1879
 Minopa reedi (Verco, J.C., 1907): synonym of Fossarina reedi (Verco, 1907)

References

 Iredale, 1924, Proceedings of the Linnean Society of New South Wales, 49(3): 182, 226
 Cotton, B.C. (1959). South Australian Mollusca. Archaeogastropoda . Adelaide : South Australian Government Printer
 Iredale, T. & McMichael, D.F. (1962). A reference list of the marine Mollusca of New South Wales. Memoirs of the Australian Museum. 11
 Ladd, H.S. (1966). Chitons and gastropods (Haliotidae through Adeorbidae) from the western Pacific Islands. United States Geological Survey, Professional Paper. 531

External links
 To World Register of Marine Species

 
Trochidae
Gastropod genera